Notolabrus is a genus of wrasses native to the eastern Indian Ocean and the southwestern Pacific Ocean from Australia to New Zealand.

Species
The seven currently recognized species in this genus are:
 Notolabrus celidotus (Bloch & J. G. Schneider, 1801) (spotty)
 Notolabrus cinctus (F. W. Hutton, 1877) (girdled wrasse)
 Notolabrus fucicola (J. Richardson, 1840) (banded parrotfish or yellow-saddled wrasse)
 Notolabrus gymnogenis (Günther, 1862) (crimsonband wrasse)
 Notolabrus inscriptus (J. Richardson, 1848) (inscribed wrasse)
 Notolabrus parilus (J. Richardson, 1850) (brown-spotted wrasse)
 Notolabrus tetricus (J. Richardson, 1840) (blue-throated wrasse)

References

 
Marine fish genera

Perciformes genera